Heteropsis nigrescens is a butterfly in the family Nymphalidae. It is found in Cameroon and the Democratic Republic of the Congo.

Subspecies
Heteropsis nigrescens nigrescens (Democratic Republic of the Congo)
Heteropsis nigrescens striata (Libert, 2006) (Cameroon)

References

Elymniini
Butterflies described in 1908